Chandrakanta ( Devanagri-चन्द्रकान्ता ; IAST-Candrakāntā) is an epic fantasy Hindi novel by Devaki Nandan Khatri. Published in 1888, it was the first modern Hindi novel. It gained a cult following, and contributed to the popularity of the Hindi language. The copyright on the novel expired in 1964 and it is now in public domain, along with other titles by the author.

It inspired Nirja Guleri's mega-budget TV serial of the same name (though the screenplay had many differences from the novel) which became one of the biggest-ever blockbusters in the history of Indian television.

Story
The story is a romantic fantasy about two lovers who belong to rival kingdoms: the princess Chandrakanta of Vijaygarh, and the prince Virendra Singh of Naugarh. Krur Singh, a member of the Vijaygarh king's court dreams of marrying Chandrakanta and taking over the throne. When Krur Singh fails in his endeavor, he flees the kingdom and befriends Shivdutt, the powerful neighboring king of Chunargarh (referring to the fort in Chunar that inspired Khatri to write the novel). Krur Singh coaxes Shivdutt to ensnare Chandrakanta at any cost. Shivdutt captures Chandrakanta and while running away from Shivdutt, Chandrakanta finds herself a prisoner in a tilism. Eventually, Kunvar Virendra Singh breaks the tilism and fights with Shivdutt with the help of aiyyars. 

The Story slowly unfolds into Chandrakanta being kidnapped and getting rescued by Chapla. However, they get trapped into a Tilism by a quirk of fate. Prince Virender Singh starts breaking the Tilism to free Chandrakanta. The Story unfolds around the efforts of Virender Singh for breaking Tilism and King Shivdutt trying to stop him to do the deed himself.

Chandrakanta, the novel, has many sequels, prominent being a 7-book series (Chandrakanta santati) dealing with the adventures of Chandrakanta and Virendra Singh's children in another major tilism.

Contents

Characters 

 Maharaja Surendra Singh (King  of Naugarh)
 Maharaja Jai Singh (King of VijayGarh )
 Virendra Singh
 Chandrakanta (also disguised as Van Kanya)
 RatnaGarbha (Chandrakanta's mother)
 Tez Singh (aiyyar of Naugarh, son of Jeet Singh)
 Devi Singh
 Diwan Jeet Singh (Diwan of Naugarh, also a grand aiyyar) (also disguised as Baba SiddhNath)
Senapati Fateh Singh (Chieftain of Vijaygarh)
 Champa & Chapla (aiyyar friends of Chandrakanta)
 Diwan Kupat Singh (father of Kroor Singh)
 Kroor Singh
 Nazim & Ahmed (aiyyars of Kroor Singh)
Hardayal Singh (Diwan of VijayGarh after death of Kupat Singh)
Ketaki (a handmaid of Chandrakanta)
Maharaja Shiv Dutt Singh (King of Chunargarh)
Maharani Kalawati (Queen of Chunargarh)
Pandit Badrinath (grand aiyyar of Shiv Dutt) (also disguised as Aafat Khan)
Pandit Jagannath Jyotishi ( a ramal-astrologer , also an aiyyar of Shiv Dutt who mid-way joins Virendra Singh )
Chunnilal, Pannalal, Ramnarayan, Ghasita Singh, Bhagwan Dutt (aiyyars of Shiv Dutt )
Zalim Khan (a dacoit, distant relative of Nazim)

Tilism and Aiyyars
Chandrakanta is notable for introducing the concepts of "Aiyyar" and "Tilism" to Hindi literature.

Aiyyar/Aiyyara 

According to Devaki nandan Khatri, An Aiyyar (male) or Aiyyara (female) is a secret agent spy fighter. He or she is expert in many arts like:
disguise, fighting skills, spying, science, fine arts, medical, and chemistry.

Disguise is must (Aiyyar/a may change him/herself into person of same or even of opposite sex but of resembling body built, by makeup).
Fighting skills are also must, for self-defence. An Aiyyar/a always overpowers any small group of ordinary soldiers.
He/she may need to spy for taking out some secrets or for finding some missing persons.
Knowledge of science and fine arts is also necessary, as it may come handy many times.
Medical knowledge, and specially that of Anaesthesia is needed for him/her.
Chemical knowledge is also needed

In a nutshell an Aiyyar is a Jack of all trades. But contrary to common belief, Khatrian Aiyyar/a are unfamiliar with magic and spells. He/she may join into any king's or landlord's service or may remain free.

The items must for an Aiyyar/a:
Kamand (a long very strong cord used to climb over building secretly, or for tying opposite Aiyyar/a or captured person/s)
Batua or purse (used to keep necessary medicines, makeup items, money and dry fruits)
Lakhlakha must also be in the 'Batua' (lakhlakha is a kind of smelling salt used to revive any unconscious person)
Khanjar or dagger (for safety and for attack)
Langot or short smart pants are usually worn by male Aiyyars when in easy mood

Ethics of Aiyyars:
Never kill or torture any other Aiyyar/a (but can arrest him/her)
Never cheat your master
Never attack too many Aiyyars over a single person

The novel depicts a number of friendly and unfriendly Aiyyar.

Aiyyars on the side of Virendrasingh include:
 Tej Singh
 Jeet Singh (Tej Singh's father)
 Devi Singh;

Aiyyars on the side of Chandrakanta:
 Chapla
 Champa

Aiyyars on the side of Krur singh:
 Nazim
 Ahmed
 Aamir

Aiyyars on the side of Shivdutt (all except last two later joined the Virendra Singh's side):
 Pandit Badrinath
 Chunnilal
 Pandit Jagannath
 Pannalal
 Ramnarayan
 Ghasita Singh
 Bhagwan Dutt

Adaptations
Chandrakanta was made into a television serial in the mid-1990s by its creator, writer, producer and director Nirja Guleri and this mega-budget serial went on to become one of the blockbusters on Indian television. The serial also introduced many new characters.

A new serial named Kahani Chandrakanta Ki was started in 2011 on Sahara One TV Channel, Based on his next novel in Chandrakanta series named Chandrakanta Santati (story about Chandrakanta's sons) by the director Sunil Agnihotri, with same degree of deviations from the original Devki Nandan Khatri novel. The story of Chandrakanta Santati was much different from the story shown by new TV serial Kahani Chandrakanta Ki. Subsequently, it failed to attract viewership and finally was cancelled.

Indian filmmaker Vidhu Vinod Chopra tried producing a film adaptation of the book, which was to be directed by Ram Madhvani. The film was to have been titled Taalismaan and included Amitabh Bachchan among the cast, playing an Aiyyar. Abhishek Bachchan was to be seen in this screen adaption of the tale of Chandrakanta. The film was never made. 

In 2017, two more TV adaptations were planned. The one on the channel Life Ok and titled Prem Ya Paheli – Chandrakanta again tries to retell the story. Unfortunately,the ending was not shown because the channel changed from Life Ok  to Star Bharat. 

Colors TV also started a TV show with the name Chandrakanta. Its story is totally different from the original novel. It was produced by Ekta Kapoor.

Sequel 
Chandrakanta was followed by Chandrakanta Santati (in 6 Volumes). The sequel chronicles the adventures of sons of Chandrakanta.

See also 
 Vijaygarh Fort 
  Chunar Fort 
  Naugarh Fort

References

External links
 Complete Chandrakanta in Gadya Kosh
 Chandrakanta at the Digital Library of India

Hindi-language novels
19th-century Indian novels
1888 novels
Indian novels adapted into television shows